Kadıköy is the western terminal station on the M4 line of the Istanbul Metro. Located beneath Haydarpaşa Rıhtım Caddesi (Street) it is serviced by the M4 between 6:00 and 0:04. The station has two tracks serving an island platform. Kadıköy opened on 17 August 2012 along with fifteen other stations on the M4 line. The Turkish Prime Minister Recep Tayyip Erdoğan along with the Mayor of Istanbul, Kadir Topbaş and other members of government inaugurated the line from Kadıköy and boarded a train to Kartal.

Kadıköy harbor is right next to the stations entrances. Ferry service offered by the municipal ferry service, Şehir Hatları (City Lines), as well the private line operator, Turyol. İDO operates SeaBus ferry service to piers on the Marmara coast of the city. İETT has a large city bus hub next to the harbor and station and operates buses to many parts of the Asian side of Istanbul.

Station Layout

Gallery

References

Railway stations opened in 2012
Istanbul metro stations
Transport in Kadıköy
2012 establishments in Turkey